Gelechia hetaeria is a moth of the family Gelechiidae. It is found in Mexico (Veracruz).

The wingspan is about 15 mm. The forewings are rosy greyish fuscous, a black spot at the base of the costa and three elongate black spots, somewhat ill-defined, along the discal cell, with a small one beyond the end of the cell and a few black marginal spots around the apex. The hindwings are pale leaden grey.

References

Moths described in 1911
Gelechia